Torque is a 2004 American action film directed by Joseph Kahn (in his feature film directorial debut), written by Matt Johnson and produced by Neal H. Moritz. The film stars Adam Scott, Martin Henderson, Ice Cube, Monet Mazur, Jaime Pressly, Will Yun Lee, Jay Hernandez, Matt Schulze, Max Beesley, Fredro Starr and Christina Milian. The film tells the story of biker Cary Ford (Martin Henderson) and how he discovers some motorcycles filled with crystal meth, he stows them away. But it turns out that villainous gangster Henry James (Matt Schulze) has plans to recover his drugs. James frames Ford for the murder of Junior (Fredro Starr), the brother of Trey (Ice Cube), who heads the Reapers, a notoriously malicious biker gang. Ford goes on the run in an attempt to clear his name, while the FBI and multiple groups of motorcycle-mounted marauders chase after him.

Torque was theatrically released on January 16, 2004 in the United States. The film under-performed at the box office, grossing $46.5 million worldwide against production budget of $40 million, and received generally negative reviews with common criticisms regarding the performances, writing and direction, though some critics praised the action sequences. It was nominated for several Taurus Awards for its stunts.

Plot

The film begins with two cars racing in the middle of the desert. Biker Cary Ford (Martin Henderson) pulls up on his motorcycle and tries to pass them. He finally does so and stops at a diner owned by his ex-girlfriend Shane (Monet Mazur). There are pictures all over the wall of Ford and Shane back when they were together. Ford takes one of the pictures. He then goes back outside and the two street racers who didn't let him pass arrive. The three get into a fight but Ford beats up both of them before letting them go.

Next Ford meets up with his two best friends Dalton (Jay Hernandez) and Val (Will Yun Lee) and as they take a ride back to town to a motorcycle party, they encounter a black biker gang called the Reapers, consisting of Trey (Ice Cube) the leader and his brother Junior (Fredro Starr), who threaten Ford after getting into a scuffle with the latter.

Ford sees Shane and the two begin conversing, with Shane saying that she is mad that Ford left. A biker gang called the Hellions pulls up which includes Henry James (Matt Schulze) the leader, his girlfriend China (Jaime Pressly) and his right-hand man Luther (Max Beesley). Henry is pissed at Ford for stealing his bikes (which contain drugs) while Ford offers a little pithy comeback in return. Henry gives Ford an ultimatum till sun down to return the bikes.

Ford and his friends arrive at a nightclub where tons of biker gangs hang out. The three gangs run into each other and cause a big brawl. A scared Junior runs into the bathroom to find the Hellions there. Junior apologizes to Henry for not being able to pay him back for a botched drug deal (which Trey refused to allow earlier) and begs Henry to give him some time to work it out. Henry refuses and kills Junior by strangling him to death with a bike chain. Ford, Shane and the two friends go back to a motel to spend the night, where Ford and Shane normalize their relationship a bit.

At the murder scene where Junior was found dead, two FBI agents, Henderson (Justina Machado)  and her partner, Jay McPherson (Adam Scott) show up, assuring Trey that they will take care of the case and find Junior's killer. China becomes a false witness to Junior's death and gives a statement that Cary Ford killed Junior, hearing which a vengeful Trey swears to kill Ford.

At a diner Shane sees on the TV that Ford is wanted for Junior's murder. Shane tells Ford and the four leave the diner and hit the road. The Reapers pull up at the diner and a high speed chase ensues with all riding into a forest full of palm trees. Ford tells Shane and the friends to split up. Ford rides out of the forest into a desert drawing Trey, resulting in the chase being led near a passenger train. Ford jumps up onto the train and Trey follows riding on top of the train and going inside the passenger cars. In the struggle, Trey slips and falls in front of the train with his leg getting caught on the tracks. Ford helps him out, gives him his own bike to escape leaving Trey puzzled. Shane, Dalton and Val meet up with Ford and the four find a cave for the night to stay.

Ford talks it out with his friends and says that he should call the FBI agents to tell them that he is innocent. Ford calls them and McPherson picks up the phone. He says that he doesn't believe Ford but Henderson does. Next morning the four leave the cave and hitch a ride inside a truck. The truck is stopped by police checkpoint and just before the agents open the back of the truck, Ford and Shane bust out of the truck in a race car with the two friends on their bikes. The four drive onto a highway with the two FBI agents and Trey on their tail.

The scene shifts to a highway as Ford jumps out of the car onto Val's bike and tells him to ride with Shane. Trey and the two agents follow. The agents survive a crash where their black Hummer hits a construction pipe. Trey rides his bike into Ford's and the two crash. Holding Trey at gunpoint, Ford explains to Trey that he did not kill Junior. Not wanting to believe him, Trey asks who the real killer is. Ford says that it was Henry and that he set them both up. Willing to take a leap of faith, Trey agrees to partner with Ford as he sets up a meeting with the agents.

At Shane's garage, Ford calls Shane and tells her that he wants her, Val and Dalton to come and meet him and Trey there. Subsequently, the two FBI agents bust in and tell Trey and Ford to get down. Henderson asks for an explanation since she believes Ford is innocent and as he tells them, McPherson turns and shoots Henderson, apparently killing her. McPherson reveals himself as Henry's mole in the agency and that he is working with the Hellions after making a deal with him. Henry, China and Luther show up with Dalton and Val in chains and Shane as hostage. Ford says that Henry can take the bikes back but Henry wants to kill Ford and Trey (after admitting to Trey that he had killed Junior).

Thereafter, a big fight scene begins with Trey killing Luther by hanging him with a chain and Henry and China leaving the garage. Ford frees Shane while Trey unties Val and Dalton and they leave the garage. Just before they do Henderson (who was wearing a bullet proof vest) blows up the garage killing McPherson. Outside of the garage, China meets up with Shane and the two fight on their bikes. The fight ends with Shane kicking China off her bike and throwing her through a car windshield, killing her.

Finally, Ford catches up with Henry on the street in a bike chase. Henry shoots at the gas of Ford's (MTT Turbine Superbike) causing gas to leak from it. Henry's subsequent shots cause the gas trail to light up. Ford soars through the air and lands on top of Henry's bike, the fire catches up to them both causing both bike's to explode throwing Ford in the air and killing Henry. Shane picks him up and they drive back to the garage to find the others. It is also revealed that Henderson survived but is injured.

Ford and Shane get back together and decide that the four need a vacation (with Shane suggesting Mexico). Val picks up his girlfriend Nina (Christina Milian) and from a distance we see the five ride off in the desert as the screen fades to black and the credits roll.

Cast
 Martin Henderson as Cary Ford, the protagonist who is framed for murder
 Ice Cube as Trey Wallace, leader of The Reapers who hated Ford for the framed murder of his brother, their member, but later, when he realized the truth, became an ally to Ford
 Monet Mazur as Shane, Ford's longtime girlfriend
 Adam Scott as FBI Agent Jay McPherson
 Matt Schulze as Henry James, leader of the Outlaw motorcycle club known as The Hellions, he is responsible for framing Ford and the film's antagonist
 Jay Hernandez as Dalton, Hispanic-American friend of Ford
 Will Yun Lee as Val, Korean-American friend of Ford
 Jaime Pressly as 'China', girlfriend of Henry James
 Max Beesley as Luther, second-in-command of The Hellions
 Christina Milian as Nina, Val's new fling and new friend of Ford
 Faizon Love as Sonny, member of The Reapers, drives a black Ford Excursion
 Fredro Starr as Junior Wallace, younger brother of Trey who is murdered
 Justina Machado as FBI Agent Tehya Henderson, partners with FBI Agent McPherson
 Hayden Mcfarland as Kho
 John Ashker as Yellow Acura RSX Driver
 Lance Gilbert as 18 Wheeler Driver

Cameos
Dane Cook makes a cameo appearance as a tourist that runs into Henry. Jesse James of West Coast Choppers and Monster Garage makes a cameo appearance in the scene where Ford and Shane are talking inside the tent. Two of his custom choppers are used later in the movie as the bikes Henry James' drugs are stored in. Also, director Joseph Kahn can be spotted as a passenger during a train chase scene. Stuntman turned director Scott Waugh also makes a cameo appearance as the driver of the red Mitsubishi Eclipse. The Peterbilt 281 from Duel makes a cameo appearance chasing a Plymouth Valiant.

Production

Soundtrack
 Track listing

The original score was done by Trevor Rabin.

Similarities to The Fast and the Furious (2001)
The film has been called "The Fast and the Furious on Motorcycles",  referring to the use of many of the same thematic elements between the two films. The film's director Joseph Kahn said his intention was to make a "piss take" version of the Fast & Furious franchise, even though both movies were produced by Neal H. Moritz. However, Torque was made by Warner Bros, while The Fast and the Furious is made by Universal.

Torque specifically references The Fast and the Furious at one point, taking a line directly from the film. Henderson's character Ford borrows Vin Diesel's line, "I live my life a quarter-mile at a time."  To which Shane (Monet Mazur) replies, "That is the dumbest thing I have ever heard."

Matt Schulze, who portrayed the film's antagonist, Henry James, also appeared in The Fast and the Furious, playing Dominic Toretto's childhood friend and member of the truck hijacking team, Vince. Schulze would later reprise his role as Vince in Fast Five, the fifth installment in the series that transitioned from street racing to an action-packed heist series.

Another reference to The Fast and the Furious is since Torque focused on motorcycles, it does show a street race in the beginning, involving a quarter-mile race between a Mitsubishi Eclipse and an Acura RSX, with the protagonist Cary Ford beating the 2 cars on his Aprilia RSV motorcycle. Also, when Ford rides past the road sign at the start of the film, it spins and reads "cars suck".

Release

Box office
The film opened at #4 at the U.S. Box office raking in $9,970,557 USD in its first opening weekend. The movie's theatrical run took in a total of $21,215,059 in the United States and worldwide $46,546,197, against a production budget of approximately $40,000,000.

Reception
On Rotten Tomatoes the film has a score of 22%  based on reviews from 116 critics. The site's consensus is that the film is "Silly and noisy ... stylish fun for the MTV crowd."  On Metacritic it has a score of 41% based on reviews from 29 critics.

A positive review came from Kevin Thomas of L.A. Times who called it "A terrific action picture. Stylish unpretentious fun." Jeremy Wheeler at allmovie.com rated Torque 3 stars out of 5 stating: "Torque is a shot of adrenaline straight to the heart, eliciting so many moments of amped-up and overblown excitement that those with medical conditions (and very serious taste in film) should probably stay ten blocks away.... this little slice of joy relishes in being abundantly over-the-top at every explosive turn."
The film has since gone on to acquire a cult following among sports-bike racers and enthusiasts, as well as racing film fans. The film has also garnered some appreciation for its over the top stunts, fast pace and stylish action sequences.

Awards 

Torque was nominated for several World Stunt Awards, including Best Specialty Stunt and Best Overall Stunt by a Stunt Man.

Home media
Torque was released on DVD and VHS on May 18, 2004. It was released on Blu-ray on April 22, 2014.

References

External links
 
 
 
 Torque at the Internet Movie Cars Database
 Torque  Dual Audio In Hindi English  at world4freeu.ml site

2004 films
2004 action films
American action films
American auto racing films
American chase films
American films about revenge
Films directed by Joseph Kahn
Films scored by Trevor Rabin
Films shot in California
American gang films
Motorcycle racing films
American road movies
2000s road movies
Village Roadshow Pictures films
Original Film films
Warner Bros. films
2004 directorial debut films
Motorsport mass media in the United States
2000s English-language films
2000s American films